Carla Lazzari (born 19 August 2005), better known by her mononym Carla, is a French singer and television presenter. She represented France in the Junior Eurovision Song Contest 2019 with the song "Bim bam toi", finishing fifth, and was one of the hosts for the Junior Eurovision Song Contest 2021 in Paris.

Biography 
Lazzari is from Châteauneuf-Villevieille near Nice in the Alpes-Maritimes department in southeastern France. She was born into a family of musicians and singers. She is of Spanish-Italian descent. At the age of 5 she entered the Conservatory of Nice.

In 2018, she reached the final of The Voice Kids France, and finished in fourth place. In 2019, she was selected by France Télévisions to represent France with the song "Bim bam toi" at that year's Junior Eurovision Song Contest in Gliwice, Poland. She ended 5th at the contest, with 169 points.

In June 2020, she released her first album, L'autre moi (English: 'The Other Me') and a music video for its title track. Her song Bim bam toi was also nominated for Song of the Year.

On 24 September 2020, she released a cover of Joe Dassin's song "Siffler sur la colline", along with a music video. In December 2020, she released a deluxe version of L'autre moi, titled L'autre moi (Réédition). The album contained all 13 songs from the original album, plus six additional tracks. The lead single of the deluxe edition was titled "Cœur sur toi" and was released on 4 November 2020.

In April 2021, it was announced that Lazzari would be the spokesperson for France at the Eurovision Song Contest 2021, reading out the French jury points at the grand final. On 4 June 2021, she released a new single titled "Alors chut", the first single of her second album Sans Filtre. The second single of this album, "Summer Summer", was released on 23 July 2021.

On 21 August 2021, an emote was added to Fortnite which featured "Bim bam toi". The emote was titled "Bim Bam Boom" and consisted of dance moves from the official music video. 

Lazzari co-hosted the Junior Eurovision Song Contest 2021 in Paris, alongside Olivier Minne and Élodie Gossuin.

Between September and November 2022, Lazzari was a participant on Danse Avec Les Stars, the French equivalent of Strictly Come Dancing. The programme was broadcast on TF1. In the final on the 11th of November, Lazzari placed 2nd behind Billy Crawford.

Discography

Studio albums

Singles

Videography

References

External links
 

French child singers
2005 births
Living people
Junior Eurovision Song Contest entrants
The Voice Kids contestants
21st-century French women singers
French people of Italian descent
Musicians from Nice
French television presenters